Stromatoporoidea is an extinct clade of sea sponges common in the fossil record from the Ordovician through the Devonian. They were especially abundant and important reef-formers in the Silurian and most of the Devonian. The group was previously thought to be related to the corals and placed in the phylum Cnidaria. They are now classified in the phylum Porifera, specifically the sclerosponges. There are numerous fossil forms with spherical, branching or encrusting skeletons of laminated calcite with vertical pillars between the laminae. Specimen of its oldest genus, Priscastroma, have been found within the Middle Ordovician Sediments. This same genus has been referred to as the species P. gemina Khrom., and is known to have been known to branch off into two forms, A and B. Form A gave rise to the genus Cystostroma while form B gave rise to the genus Labechia and its descendants. Paleozoic stromatoporoids died out at the Hangenberg Event at the end of the Devonian. Purported Mesozoic stromatoporoids may be unrelated, thus making "stromatoporoids" a polyphyletic group if they are included.

Stromatoporoids are useful markers whose form and occurrence can diagnose the depositional environment of sedimentary strata. Paleozoic stromatoporoids hosted various symbiotic endobionts such as rugosans, syringoporids, worms and cornulitids.

References

External links
University of California, Berkeley 2019 museum blog post on Stromatoporoidea
Digital Atlas of Ancient Life page on Stromatoporoidea

 
Ordovician invertebrates
Devonian animals
Late Devonian animals
Silurian animals
Prehistoric animal classes